Doxa is a small but well-known cave in Marathos.

There is a taverna located right next to the mouth of the cave. You can borrow flashlights at this taverna which is essential to go into the cave.

From the entrance begins a downhill corridor which leads to 4 rooms. The name Doxa means glory in Greek.

References

Caves of Greece
Landforms of Crete
Tourist attractions in Crete